The Gallaceaceae are a family of fungi in the order Hysterangiales, containing species found in Australia and New Zealand. The family contains three genera and 16 species.

References

External links

Hysterangiales
Basidiomycota families